Richard John Gillings was Archdeacon of Macclesfield from 1994  to 2010.
Born on 17 September 1945, he was educated at Sale Grammar School and  St Chad's College, Durham. He was ordained after a period of study at Lincoln Theological College in 1971 and began his career with a curacy in  Altrincham. After this he was Priest in charge at  St Thomas’, Stockport and then Rector of  Birkenhead Priory. From 1993 to 2005 he was Vicar of Bramhall.

Notes

1945 births
People educated at Sale Grammar School
Alumni of St Chad's College, Durham
Alumni of Lincoln Theological College
Archdeacons of Macclesfield
Living people